Raimund is thought to be a variant of the name Raymond.

Raimund may refer to:

 Ferdinand Raimund (1790-1836), Austrian actor and dramatist
 Raimund Theater, a theatre in the Mariahilf district of Vienna, Austria

People with the given name Raimund:

 Baron Raimund von Stillfried (1839-1911), Austrian photographer
 Raimund Abraham (1933–2010), Austrian architect
 Raimund Bethge (born 1947), East German bobsledder
 Raimund Herincx (born 1927), British operatic bass baritone
 Raimund Krauth (1952–2012), German footballer
 Raimund Kull (1882–1942), Estonian conductor and composer
 Raimund Hermann Siegfried Moltke (born 1869), German writer and economist
 Raimund Marasigan (born 1971), Filipino rock musician and record producer
 Raimund Pigneter (20th century), Italian luger
 Raimund Riedewald (born 1986), Dutch footballer

See also

 Raimond
 Raymund Schwager (1935-2004), Swiss Roman Catholic theologian

Masculine given names
Estonian masculine given names
German masculine given names